Sterculia is a genus of flowering plants in the mallow family, Malvaceae: subfamily Sterculioideae (previously placed in the now obsolete Sterculiaceae). Members of the genus are colloquially known as tropical chestnuts. Sterculia may be monoecious or dioecious, and its flowers unisexual or bisexual.

Taxonomy

Phylogeny 
A 27-million-year-old †Sterculia labrusca leaf fossil is described from the Evros region in Western Thrace, Greece.

Species 
The Plant List counts 91 currently accepted species. The accepted species are listed here, except as noted.
Sterculia abbreviata E.L.Taylor ex Mondragón 
Sterculia aerisperma Cuatrec. 
Sterculia africana (Lour.) Fiori – Mopopaja tree
Sterculia albidiflora Ducke
Sterculia alexandri Harv. – Cape sterculia
Sterculia amazonica E.L.Taylor ex Mondragón
Sterculia antioquia E.L.Taylor
Sterculia apeibophylla Ducke
Sterculia alexandri (Jacq.) H.Karst.
Sterculia apetala (Jacq.) H.Karst. – Panama tree; manduvi tree
Sterculia appendiculata K.Schum.
Sterculia balanghas L. or Aiton (status unresolved)
Sterculia brevissima H.H. Hsue
Sterculia caribaea R. Br.
Sterculia ceramica R. Br.
Sterculia chapelieri Baill.
Sterculia chicomendesii E.L. Taylor
Sterculia cinerea Schweinf. or A.Rich. (status unresolved)
Sterculia cinnamomifolia Tsai & Mao
Sterculia cochinchinensis Pierre Trôm nam in Vietnam (status unresolved)
Sterculia colombiana Sprague
Sterculia colorata  – Scarlet sterculia (synonym of Firmiana colorata)
Sterculia comorensis Sprague
Sterculia corrugata Little
Sterculia costaricana Pittier
Sterculia curiosa (Vell.) Taroda
Sterculia dawei Sprague
Sterculia duckei E.L. Taylor ex J.A.C. Silva & M.F. Silva
Sterculia euosma W.W. Sm.
Sterculia excelsa Mart.
Sterculia foetida L. – bastard poon tree, hazel sterculia, wild almond tree 
Sterculia frondosa Rich.
Sterculia gengmaensis H.H. Hsue
Sterculia gilva Miq.
Sterculia guangxiensis S.J. Xu & P.T. Li
Sterculia guapayensis Cuatrec.
Sterculia guianensis Sandwith
Sterculia guttata Roxb. ex G.Don (status unresolved)
Sterculia hainanensis Merr. and Chun
Sterculia henryi Hemsl.
Sterculia hymenocalyx K. Schum.
Sterculia hypochroa Pierre – Trôm quạt in Vietnam (status unresolved)
Sterculia impressinervis H.H. Hsue
Sterculia kayae P.E. Berry
Sterculia khasiana Debb.
Sterculia killipiana Standl. ex E.L.Taylor
Sterculia kingtungensis H.H. Hsue
Sterculia lanceifolia Roxb.
Sterculia lanceolata Cav. (synonym for S. tonkinensis Aug. DC.)
Sterculia lisae E.L. Taylor
Sterculia macerenica E.L. Taylor
Sterculia mexicana R.Br.
Sterculia mhoysa Engl.
Sterculia micrantha Chun and H.H. Hsue
Sterculia mirabilis (A. Chev.) Roberty
Sterculia monosperma Vent. – China chestnut, seven sisters' fruit, pheng phok
Sterculia multiovula E.L. Taylor
Sterculia murex Hemsl. – Lowveld chestnut
Sterculia narioensis E.L. Taylor
Sterculia oblonga Mast.
Sterculia ornatisepala E.L. Taylor
Sterculia paniculata 
Sterculia parviflora Roxb.
Sterculia pendula Ducke
Sterculia peruviana (D.R. Simpson) E.L. Taylor ex Brako and Zarucchi
Sterculia petensis E.L. Taylor
Sterculia pexa Pierre
Sterculia pinbienensis Tsai & Mao
Sterculia principis Gagnep.
Sterculia pruriens (Aubl.) K.Schum.
Sterculia purpurea E.L. Taylor
Sterculia quadrifida  – Gorarbar (status unresolved)
Sterculia quinqueloba (Garcke) K.Schum. – Five-lobed sterculia
Sterculia rebeccae E.L. Taylor
Sterculia recordiana Standl.
Sterculia rhinopetala K.Schum. – Red sterculia
Sterculia rigidifolia Ducke
Sterculia rogersii N.E. Br. – Ulumbu tree
Sterculia rugosa R.Br.
Sterculia rubiginosa Vent – Bai rua long in Vietnam
Sterculia scandens Hemsl.
Sterculia schliebenii Mildbr.
Sterculia setigera Delile
Sterculia simaoensis Y.Y. Qian
Sterculia speciosa K.Schum.
Sterculia steyermarkii E.L. Taylor ex Mondragón
Sterculia stigmarota Pierre (status unresolved)
Sterculia stipulifera Ducke
Sterculia striata A. St.-Hil. & Naudin
Sterculia subnobilis H.H. Hsue
Sterculia subracemosa Chun & H.H. Hsue
Sterculia subviolacea K.Schum.
Sterculia tavia Baill.
Sterculia tessmannii Mildbr.
Sterculia tonkinensis Aug. DC.
Sterculia tantraensis 
Sterculia tragacantha Lindl.
Sterculia urens  – Gulu (synonym of Firmiana simplex)
S. urens var. thorelii is a synonym of S. thorelii Pierre – (Bay thua Thorel in Vietnam)
Sterculia venezuelensis Pittier
Sterculia villifera Steud. – Broad-leaved bottle tree
Sterculia villosa Roxb.
Sterculia xolocotzii T. Wendt & E.L. Taylor
Sterculia yuanjiangensis H.H. Hsue & X.J.Xu

Deprecated

Etymology 
The scientific name is taken from Sterculius of Roman mythology, who was the god of manure; this is in reference to the unpleasant aroma of the flowers of this genus (e.g. Sterculia foetida).

Ecology
Sterculia species are food plants for the larvae of some Lepidoptera species including the leaf miner Bucculatrix xenaula, which feeds exclusively on this genus.

Toxicity and uses
The pods, particularly those of S. foetida, contain seeds reported to be edible, with a taste similar to cocoa. However, the oil contains cyclopropene fatty acids which could be carcinogenic or co-carcinogenic.

Gum karaya is extracted from Sterculia species, and is used as a thickener and emulsifier in foods, as a laxative, and as a denture adhesive.  In India, this is sourced from: Gujarat, Maharashtra, Madras, Madhya Pradesh and Chhota Nagpur.

References

External links

FAO: Species with edible "nuts" listed by families angiosperms (under Sterculiaceae)

 
Malvaceae genera